William Nunnerley was the Secretary of the Football Association of Wales (1903–05) and an international referee.

Early life
Nunnerley was born in Ellesmere in 1865.

As a youth he played for Ellesmere and Oswestry.

Career
Prior to becoming Secretary of the Football Association of Wales, Nunnerley was an elected council member of the FAW, he was a representative of Wrexham Victoria and Wrexham St Giles.

Nunnerley resigned as Secretary of the FAW in September 1905.

Death
Nunnerley died in Ellesmere on Friday 10 February 1922.

References

Welsh football referees
Welsh footballers
Association football defenders
1865 births
1922 deaths